The Commission for the Management and Application of Geoscience Information (CGI), usually referred to by the unofficial "Commission for Geoscience Information" is subcommittee grade scientific organization that concerns itself with geological standard, information management and interoperability matters on a global scale.

About
The Commission for the Management and Application of Geoscience Information (CGI) is a working subcommittee of the International Union of Geological Sciences. The Commission meets usually annually, and at the quadrennial meetings scheduled by the IUGS at the International Geological Congress.

The Commission is the governing body responsible for the XML-based exchange languages Geoscience Markup Language (GeoSciML - in collaboration with the Open Geospatial Consortium) and EarthResource Markup Language (EarthResourceML). The CGI and its members also play a significant role in the OneGeology initiative.

Aims
The Commission for the Management and Application of Geoscience Information (CGI) mission is to enable the global exchange of knowledge about geoscience information and systems.

Specifically CGI aims to:

 Provide the means for transferring knowledge on geoscience information and systems
 Stimulate international dissemination of best practice in geoscience information
 Stimulate and support initiatives which are developing standards
 Establish and occupy an accepted position in the international geoscience information community and represent IUGS on geoscience information matters.

Methodology
The Commission for the Management and Application of Geoscience Information has created two working groups, the Interoperability Working Group and the Geoscience Terminology Working Group.

The Interoperability Working Group aims to develop and test relevant and timely geological information standards. The ultimate objective of the working group is to enable seamless web integration of select information hosted at different locations in varied formats. It aims to achieve this by:
 develop a conceptual model of geoscientific information based on existing information models
 implement a subset of this model, the Geoscience Mark-up Language, referred to as GeoSciML as an extension of Geography Markup Language 
 implement an interchange format for geoscience information related to mines and mineral resources (EarthResourceML)
 identify areas that require standardised vocabularies in order to enable data exchange and develop vocabularies for populating GeoSciML instance documents.

The Multi-lingual Thesaurus Working Group was formed in 2003 to continue work of the Multhes working group of the 1990s. The goal was to enable the global exchange of geoscience information by establishing a common multilingual core vocabulary by developing and expanding the Multilingual Thesaurus of Geosciences.  In 2012, vocabulary development activities of the Interoperability Working Group (the Concept Definition Task Group) were merged with the activities of the Multi-lingual Thesaurus Working Group to form a new Geoscience Terminology Working Group that will organize and coordinate ongoing development of geoscience terminology for use in information exchange.

References

External links
 
 
 

Standards
Geology organizations
International scientific organizations
International organisations based in Germany